Fred Voelckerling (21 August 1872 – 27 January 1945) was a German sculptor. His work was part of the sculpture event in the art competition at the 1928 Summer Olympics.

References

1872 births
1945 deaths
20th-century German sculptors
20th-century German male artists
German male sculptors
Olympic competitors in art competitions
People from Berlin